Radio Romance is a 2018 South Korean television series starring Yoon Doo-joon and Kim So-hyun, with Yoon Park and Yura. It aired on KBS2's Mondays and Tuesdays at 22:00 (KST) time slot from January 29 to March 20, 2018.

Synopsis
Song Geu-rim (Kim So-hyun) has always wanted to become a radio writer. However, because she lacks the writing skills, she was always forced to be an assistant writer. When her only show faces cancellation, she must secure her place as writer. So she decides to try casting Ji Soo-ho (Yoon Doo-joon), a top star actor who's known to have a "perfect life".

Cast

Main
 Yoon Doo-joon as Ji Soo-ho, a top actor who is accustomed to act based on scripts. He ends up becoming the DJ for a live radio show where nothing ever goes according to plan.
 Nam Da-reum as young Ji Soo-ho
 Kim So-hyun as Song Geu-rim, the writer of Soo-ho's radio show with five years of experience as an assistant writer. She lacks writing skills but possesses excellent planning skills.
 Lee Re as young Song Geu-rim
 Yoon Park as Lee Kang, the radio station's competent producing director. Because of his perfectionism, every program he handles achieved No. 1 in listener ratings.
 Yura as Jin Tae-ri, an over-the-hill actress who fell from grace due to a DUI accident that happened three years ago.

Supporting

People around Soo-ho and Geu-rim
 Ha Jun as Kim Jun-woo (33 years old), Soo-ho's long-time manager who oversees the actor's every move.
 Kwak Dong-yeon as Jason (28 years old), a psychiatrist who is Soo-ho's high school classmate and personal doctor.
 Oh Hyun-kyung as Nam Joo-ha (51 years old), Soo-ho's legal mother who is the CEO of JH Entertainment.
 Kim Byung-se as Ji Yoon-seok (55 years old), Soo-ho's father who is a veteran actor.
 Seo Ye-seul as Jung Da-seul (23 years old), an actress who is very popular. She is having an affair with Soo-ho's father.
 Kim Ye-ryeong as Jo Ae-ran (53 years old), Geu-rim's mother. She became blind during a surgery she had when she was 39.

Radio station staff
 Kim Hye-eun as Ra Ra-hee (41 years old), radio program writer.
 Im Ji-kyu as Lee Seung-soo (44 years old), radio program director.
 Jo Byeong-kyu as Go Hoon-jung (30 years old), radio assistant director.
 Lee Won-jong as Kang Hee-seok (55 years old), radio station director.
 Yoon Joo-sang as Moon Seong-woo (57 years old), DJ of a thirty-year old radio program.

Radio station sub-writer members
 Ryu Hye-rin as "Tornado"
 Shim Eun-woo as "Gamoom"
 Jung Yoo-rim as "Jangma"

Others
 Jung Hee-tae as Ahn Bong-seob (37 years old), a reporter.
Choi Min-yeong as Woo Ji-woo, Soo-ho's friend who, 12 years ago, liked Geu-rim. Died in a car accident.

Special appearances
 U-Kwon as Kang Minu ( 1)
 Ji Il-joo as Oh Jin-soo (Ep. 2–3)
 Jung Gyu-soo as an amnesiac old man (Ep. 4)
 Bona as DJ Jay (Ep. 5)

Production
 Lead actors Yoon Doo-joon and Kim So-hyun first worked together in a 2014 advertisement. Yoon also made a cameo appearance in the 2016 TV series Hey Ghost, Let's Fight that starred Kim.
 The series is a joint production of Urban Works Media (producer of the Bad Guys series) and Plusis Media (a subsidiary of the Sports Seoul-Seoul Shinmun group launched in 2017) for KBS.
 The first script reading of the cast was held on December 19, 2017 at KBS Annex Broadcasting Station in Yeouido, Seoul.

Original soundtrack

Part 1

Part 2

Part 3

Part 4

Part 5

Part 6

Controversy
On January 24, 2018, a photo was shared online saying that lead actress Kim So-hyun was shooting underwater. The photo shows a woman wearing a hanbok in the water on January 21. On that day, the lowest temperature was recorded below -16°C (3°F). During the press conference for the premiere of Radio Romance held on January 25, the drama's PD addressed online criticism regarding the outdoor water filming, despite the weather warnings. He issued an apology stating that "Kim So Hyun's outdoor water filming wrapped up on Sunday (Jan 21st). We debated on it a lot, since she would be getting in the water. We ensured safety equipment nearby, as well as a camping car on set, and finished filming in the shortest amount of time possible. Due to time constraints, an action stunt double filmed additional outdoor water scenes yesterday (Jan 24th). It was filmed by an action actor, not Kim So-hyun, wearing a winter suit and shot in a similar situation (Jan 21st). The number of shots was done with one take and protection was taken right away. We apologize for causing concerns with this matter. The filming set is our life. Naturally, safety is important." At the press conference, Kim's hand was seen red.

Ratings

Awards and nominations

Notes

References

External links
  
 
 
 

Korean Broadcasting System television dramas
Korean-language television shows
2018 South Korean television series debuts
2018 South Korean television series endings
South Korean romance television series
Television series by Urban Works Media